Gymnothorax parini is a moray eel found in the western Indian Ocean, around Walters Shoals. It was first named by Collette, Smith and Böhlke in 1991.

References

parini
Fish described in 1991